Mitrella vosvictori is a species of sea snail in the family Columbellidae, the dove snails.

Description
The length of the shell attains 21.3 mm.

Distribution
This marine species occurs in the Sulu Sea, off the Philippines.

References

Monsecour D. & Monsecour K. (2009). Two new species of Mitrella (Gastropoda: Neogastropoda: Columbellidae) from the Philippines. Novapex 10(1): 1-4

vosvictori
Gastropods described in 2009